Raja Rani is a 2013 Indian Tamil-language romantic comedy drama film directed by Atlee in his directorial debut. Produced by AR Murugadoss, the film stars Arya, Jai, Nayanthara and Nazriya Nazim, while Sathyaraj, Santhanam, Sathyan appear in supporting roles. The core plot of the movie was heavily inspired by the 1986 Tamil  film Mouna Ragam and the 2007 Kannada film Milana. 

The film released on 27 September 2013, and received positive reviews upon release. It was remade in Bengali as Shudhu Tomari Jonyo in 2015 and was remade in Odia as Tu Je Sei in 2016.

Plot 
The movie begins with the marriage of John and Regina at a church. The marriage is an arranged one, to which both have consented reluctantly to make their parents happy. After the marriage, they live together as strangers in their apartment, where the neighbours are upset with John who comes home drunk every night, which he does deliberately to annoy Regina. Eventually, Regina applies for a transfer to Australia to stay away from John.

One night, Regina falls into fits. John calls an ambulance and takes her to the hospital, where he is unable to respond to the doctor's queries about Regina's age and medical history. When he goes to apologise to the doctor later on, he is told that it is important to know about his wife's health, even if he dislikes her. John then asks Regina about her health issues, and she reveals that she had fits twice in the past. The movie sees its first flashback as she explains her past and the love of her life, Surya.

While in college, she falls in love with Surya, who works in the call center of a mobile company. Surya gets selected for airline cabin-crew training in the US. They decide to inform their parents about their love but his father objects to their relationship and hence they decide to get married without informing their parents. On the designated day, Surya fails to show up at the register office for the wedding. Regina's father James feels sorry for his daughter and takes Regina to Surya's house, where they learn that Surya has already left for the US. A few days later, Regina gets a call from Surya's friend Aiyappan, saying that Surya had committed suicide in the US. In her shock, she suffers fits for the first time.

Upon hearing this story, John begins to like Regina and now has immense respect for her. Regina, however, continues to treat John with scant respect, until one day, when Sarathy comes to their flat and reveals John's past in the second major flashback of the movie. John had fallen in love with Keerthana, and they eventually get married. On the day after their marriage, Keerthana is hit by a car while crossing the road, and she dies in front of John. This leaves John heartbroken and he vows not to marry another girl again. 4 years later, Sarathy consoles him and convinces him to marry again. This brings back the events that occurred in the beginning of the film with John wedding Regina.

Regina now begins to like John. Though they like each other, they never reveal it to each other. Finally, on John's birthday, Regina gives John a gift and insists that he open it alone, but John never opens the gift as he thinks that Regina is only pretending to be affectionate in front of her father.

Regina's request for the transfer to Australia is approved. When she tells John, while he was having a beer that she bought for him, he asks her to go ahead with her plans, as he thinks that she was trying to bribe him with the beer to get him to agree to a divorce, while she actually wanted to express her love for him.

John drops off Regina at the airport. When he is about to leave the airport, he gets a call from Regina, who tells him that she saw Surya at the emigration counter. John rushes off to meet Surya and tries to get him to accept Regina. Surya says that he was forced to leave by his father and that he faked his suicide so that Regina would get over him. Surya lies to John saying that he is now happily married and tells John that one cannot always marry the girl he loves, but should always love the girl he marries. As he leaves, he glances at the ring in his hand, which was gifted to him by Regina, showing that Surya will always live with the memories of their relationship and never marry another girl.

Regina, who is terribly angry, slaps John as she never wanted to get back with Surya, as that was the past. Regina throws the gift that John never opened. When he opens it he finds the words "Let's begin our new Life". John and Regina realise their love for each other and begin their life together.

Cast 

 Arya as John (Regina's husband and Keerthana's husband in the past)
 Jai as Surya Muthuraman (Regina's boyfriend in the past)
 Nayanthara as Regina John (John's wife and Surya's girlfriend in the past) (Voiceover by Deepa Venkat)
 Nazriya Nazim as Keerthana (John's wife in the past)
 Santhanam as Sarathy (John's friend)
 Sathyan as Aiyappan (Surya's workmate/friend)
 Sathyaraj as James (Regina's father)
 Rajendran as Henry, John's boss
 Manobala as Ramamoorthy, Surya's boss and the AirVoice CEO
 Dhanya as Nivitha (Regina's college friend)
 Misha Ghoshal as Madhu (Regina's workmate/friend)
 Arunraja as Udumbe
 Singamuthu as Vettukili (Sarathy's uncle)
 Wong as John's friend in past
 Swaminathan as Flat secretary
 T. M. Karthik as Booshan (Keerthana's boss)
 Jangiri Madhumitha as Regina's college mate
 K. Bujji Babu as Keerthana's father
 Pandian as Surya's father
 Pradeep Kottayam as Nivitha's father
 Chelladurai as Marriage registration official
 Prema Priya as Udumbe's girlfriend
 Sakshi Agarwal as girl ordering cappuccino (uncredited)
 Sai Dheena as a bully (cameo appearance)
 Gaana Bala in a special appearance

Production

Casting 
In early 2012, Atlee, an assistant director to Shankar, narrated his script to Rama Narayanan, who agreed to finance the film. Atlee revealed he wrote the script with Arya in mind to portray the lead role, and was insistent on signing Nayanthara as the female lead as he felt they made a good on-screen pair. Atlee had initially selected Sivakarthikeyan to portray a role in the film, but subsequently chose Jai to appear as Nayanthara's love interest in a flashback segment. Nani was also considered for Arya's role, but he did not have the dates. Priya Anand was considered another leading role, but the opportunity was later offered to Nazriya Nazim who had made her debut with Neram (2013) in Tamil films. Sathyaraj, Santhanam and Sathyan were also signed to play other supporting roles in the film. The film has music by G. V. Prakash Kumar, art direction by T. Muthuraj and cinematography by debutant George C. Williams, a former associate of Nirav Shah.

Filming 
The film began its first schedule at a bungalow in Greams road, Chennai. Kamal Haasan switched on the camera and a song picturising Jai and Nayanthara was canned on the occasion. The sequence involving Jai and Nayanthara were canned first and Arya joined the team after completing his work on Irandam Ulagam.

Themes and influences 
Critics have noted that the film draws similarities and inspirations from Mani Ratnam's Mouna Ragam  and the Kannada movie Milana.

Soundtrack 

The soundtrack album for Raja Rani was composed by G. V. Prakash Kumar. The lyrics were penned by Na. Muthukumar, Pa. Vijay and Gaana Bala. The single "Hey Baby" was released on 19 August 2013. The complete album was released on 23 August 2013 at Sathyam Cinemas, Chennai. The audio was released by actors Jiiva and Arya.

Behindwoods rated the album 3.25 out of 5, and said "G.V strikes with lively & cheerful melodies. A very pleasant album !" IndiaGlitz rated it 2.5 out of 5 and said, "GV Prakash keeps his promise". Cinemalead.com rated the album with 3.5 out of 5 stars and said the album is Innovative, Interesting and Intriguing

Release 
A first official film teaser showing the lead pair quarrelling through their projections in a mirror, was released on 11 May 2013 by Fox Star Studios. The teaser went instantly viral garnering a large number of views. The film released in many theatres across the USA especially Towne 3 cinemas in San Jose. The film was a blockbuster.

The official trailer was released along with the music album in a very innovative manner on 23 August 2013. The trailer was released on YouTube earlier in the day and was simultaneously telecast across 12 television channels at 7 PM. The trailer received positive response.

Critical reception 
Raja Rani received positive reviews from critics. Rediff rated it 3/5 and stated, "Debutant director Atlee's Raja Rani is a simple refreshing tale about how to cope with life, when we lose someone we love. The film has a lot going for it and definitely succeeds in entertaining the audience." Behindwoods rated it 3/5 and stated "The movie's running time is 2 hours 45 minutes and there are moments in the second half leading to the finale which sag. The end product could have been much tauter. To sum up, though the second half of Raja Rani moves along predictable lines, it's still a promising debut by Atlee". The Times of India gave 3 stars out of 5 and wrote "The film does leave you exhausted by the time it ends. Still, it remains always watchable, mainly because the director, like his mentor Shankar, embraces his old school storytelling methods with conviction".

Sudhish Kamath of The Hindu cited "Atlee's promising debut Raja Rani merits a watch in spite of its fundamentally flawed structure". IndiaGlitz said, "One look at the movie and there might be suspicions of Atlee as a debutant, he gives away a clean family entertainer with no hoopla's. There are two other major contributing factors. George C. Williams's enchanting cinematography giving a bouncing color to the film, and flows with freshness. And the other is GV's music, if the songs are chartbusters, then the BGM is another success story. They flow well with the scenes right from the start to the end, way to go team."

In contrast, Gautaman Bhaskaran of Hindustan Times rated it 2 stars and said, "At a little over 150 minutes, Raja Rani is a bumpy ride with potholes of songs, with characters who are nothing better than caricatures and with a romance that hardly engages". Sify too gave an unfavourable review stating, "Debutant director Atlee's highly hyped Raja Rani starts off promisingly and keeps us engaged in the first half. But post-interval it loses steam, and turns out to be a cheesy, emotionally manipulative drama with a predictable long drawn out climax that goes on and on for 35 minutes".

Box office 
The film released in 350 screens in Tamil Nadu. It earned approximately  32 million on its first day, which was said to be Arya's best ever opening, and had collected an opening weekend collection of  122 million in Tamil Nadu, Kerala and Karnataka. The total collections from overseas market after the opening weekend were estimated at  50 million. The film thus emerged as the third blockbuster in Arya's career after Arinthum Ariyamalum and Boss Engira Bhaskaran as well as the fifth most successful film of the year.

It was remade in Bengali as Shudhu Tomari Jonyo in 2015, with Dev reprising Arya's role, Srabanti Chatterjee reprising Nayanthara's role, Soham Chakraborty reprising Jai's role and Mimi Chakraborty reprising Nazriya Nazim's role. It was also remade in 2016 in Odia as Tu Je Sei starring Babushan.

Awards and nominations

Legacy 
The scene where John (Arya) marries Regina (Nayanthara) is spoofed in Director's own Bigil. In the film, Angel (Nayanthara) refuses to marry John (Abi Saravanan) and instead falls for Michael (Vijay).

References

External links 
 

2013 films
Films scored by G. V. Prakash Kumar
Indian romantic drama films
2010s Tamil-language films
Films set in Chennai
Films shot in Chennai
Fox Star Studios films
Tamil films remade in other languages
2013 directorial debut films
2013 romantic drama films
Films directed by Atlee (director)